Quercus cedrosensis, the Cedros Island oak, is a species of plant in the family Fagaceae. It is placed in Quercus section Protobalanus.

Quercus cedrosensis is native to Baja California state in northwestern Mexico, including Cedros Island. It has also been found in San Diego County, California.

Quercus cedrosensis is vulnerable to habitat loss due to overgrazing by goats and overlogging.

References

cedrosensis
Flora of California
Cedros Island
Natural history of the California chaparral and woodlands
Natural history of San Diego County, California
Trees of Baja California
Plants described in 1962
Taxonomy articles created by Polbot
Oaks of Mexico